Stephen Leacock Collegiate Institute (SLCI, Stephen Leacock, or Leacock) and John Buchan Senior Public School (JBSPS, John Buchan or Buchan) are two public middle and secondary schools in Toronto, Ontario, Canada. The schools are owned and operated by the Toronto District School Board that were originally part of the Scarborough Board of Education of the former suburb of Scarborough. Serving the Tam O'Shanter – Sullivan community, the school offers business, math and technology courses. Leacock's motto is Tuum Est, Latin for "It is Up to You".

History
Built in 1969 on a 20-acre property on Birchmount Road north of Sheppard Avenue, John Buchan opened on September 2, 1969 and Stephen Leacock Collegiate opened on September 8, 1970 as the borough's fifteenth collegiate institute. Both schools are connected to one building on Birchmount Road and form a larger kindergarten to Grade 12 campus with Pauline Johnson Jr. Public School. The school was designed by architects, Abram and Ingelson, following trends of brutalist architecture. The schools were named after John Buchan, the fifteenth Governor General of Canada and Stephen Leacock, an English Canadian teacher, political scientist, writer, and humourist.

Overview
Leacock offers the APEX Advanced Placement program.

Structure
Both Leacock and Buchan are situated in one building located on 2450 Birchmount Road. Both schools share an auditorium and library while the layout is separated from the rest of both schools. Located in 21 acres at a combined 247,263 sq. ft. building with three floors, the two schools contain over 40 classrooms/science labs, two floor library, cafeteria, specialized television and radio studios, four gym spaces, 1000 seat auditorium with DMX lighting consoles and  a three-bay automotive shop.

The 23 m, six lane pool is shared by both schools and is overseen by the board's realtor subsidiary, Toronto Lands Corporation. It is also used by several swimming clubs and schools, including C & C Aquatic Club, Champion Athletic Club, Chaco’s Winner Swimming Club, J. Dolphins School of Swimming and Wendy and Yaya's School of Swimming.

Notable alumni
 Jeff Harding, NHL hockey player, Philadelphia Flyers, Canadian Olympic Team, Michigan State Spartans
Gary Dillon, NHL hockey player
 John Does 1, 2, and 3, unnamed juvenile members of the Toronto 18
 Linda Ballantyne, voice actress
 Amin Durrani, member of the Toronto 18
 "Tarzan" Dan Freeman, radio DJ and television host
 Steve Guolla, former NHL hockey player
 Mark Kirton, NHL hockey player
 Stacey McKenzie, fashion model
 Mark McKoy, 1992 Olympic Gold Medalist 110M Hurdles
 Mike Myers, actor, comedian, screenwriter, former Saturday Night Live castmember (also attended Sir John A. Macdonald Collegiate Institute)
 Elva Ni, winner of the Miss Chinese Toronto Pageant, 2005
 Fred Patterson, Humble and Fred, co-host, 102.1 The Edge
 Bill Root, NHL hockey player
 Vicky Sunohara, former ice hockey player, Olympic gold medallist
 Behn Wilson, former NHL hockey player, Philadelphia Flyers and Chicago Blackhawks

See also
List of high schools in Ontario

References

External links

John Buchan Senior Public School
TDSB Profile (Leacock)
TDSB Profile (Buchan)
Leacock Guidance

Education in Scarborough, Toronto
High schools in Toronto
Schools in the TDSB
Educational institutions established in 1970
Brutalist architecture in Canada
1970 establishments in Ontario
Toronto Lands Corporation